A list of films produced by the Bollywood film industry based in
Mumbai in 1992. Superstars of this year in film industry included Aamir Khan Govinda, Shah Rukh Khan, Madhuri Dixit, Divya Bharti, Juhi Chawla, Anil Kapoor etc.

Highest grossing films

January–March

April–June

July–September

October–December

Films A-Z

References

External links
 Bollywood films of 1992 at the Internet Movie Database

1992
Bollywood
 Boll
1992 in Indian cinema